Grassland or Grasslands may refer to:
 Grassland, vegetation and landscape type
 Grassland (film), a 2022 Iranian drama film
or it may refer to specific places:

in Canada
 Grassland, Alberta, hamlet in northern Alberta

in the United States (by state)

 Grasslands (Finchville, Kentucky), listed on the NRHP in Shelby County, Kentucky
 Grassland (Annapolis Junction, Maryland), listed on the National Register of Historic Places in Maryland

 Grassland Farm, listed on the National Register of Historic Places in Bedford County, Tennessee
 Grassland, Texas, an unincorporated community in Lynn County, West Texas
 Lyndon B. Johnson National Grassland, a national grassland in North Texas